Strzelino  (German Groß Strellin) is a village in the administrative district of Gmina Słupsk, within Słupsk County, Pomeranian Voivodeship, in northern Poland. 

The village has a population of 478.

References

Strzelino